Saint Marys is a civil parish in York County, New Brunswick, Canada.

For governance purposes it is divided between the city of Fredericton, the Indian reserve of Devon 30, and the local service district of the parish of Saint Marys, of which are the city and the LSD are members of Regional Service Commission 11 (RSC11). The LSD includes the special service areas of Evergreen Park and Pepper Creek.

Origin of name
The parish was settled in part by Loyalists from Maryland.

St. Mary's County, Maryland was established well before the American Revolution and may have been the source of some of the Loyalists.

History
Saint Marys was erected in 1786 as one of York County's original parishes. The parish ran thirty miles inland and extended to the Keswick River.

In 1824 part of Saint Marys was included in the newly erected Douglas Parish.

In 1837 part of Saint Marys was included in the newly erected Stanley Parish.

In 1838 Stanley was dissolved and its territory implicitly returned to its original parishes.

In 1847 part of Saint Marys was included in a new, much larger Stanley Parish.

In 1945 the town of Devon was annexed by Fredericton. The boundary description of Saint Marys in the Territorial Division Act (TDA) implicitly removes the area from Saint Marys but the Fredericton entry in the TDA is not updated.

In 1952 two grants were transferred to Saint Marys from Douglas. The boundary description of Fredericton was also updated, removing any ambiguity. The modern boundaries of Fredericton are not reflected in the TDA, having changed after the last revision of the Act.

Boundaries
Saint Marys Parish is bounded:

 on the north beginning at a point about 650 metres north-northwesterly of Red Rock Branch Road and 900 metres west-southwesterly of Route 107, at the northwestern corner of Loyalist grants along the Nashwaak River, then running easterly along the grant lines and their prolongation to the Sunbury County line, about 1.1 kilometres southwest of Cains River;
 on the southeast by the Sunbury County line, running southwesterly to the Saint John River;
 on the southwest by the Saint John River and a line beginning on the north bank of the Nashwaak River at the prolongation of Irvine Street, then northwesterly along Irvine Street, Eco Terra Drive, and the prolongation of Eco Terra Drive to meet the prolongation of Douglas Avenue near Ring Road;
 on the west by a line running northeasterly along the prolongation of Douglas Avenue to the southwestern line of the Devon 30 Indian reserve, then northwest about 5 kilometres along the reserve and its prolongation to the eastern line of a grant to Daniel Sawyer, about 2.3 kilometres west of Route 148, then north about 10 kilometres to the South Branch Dunbar Stream, then easterly about 1.25 kilometres down the South Branch Dunbar to the western line of a grant to Samuel and John Casey, then northerly about 1.4 kilometres and easterly about 1.6 kilometres around the Casey grant to meet the rear line of the Loyalist grants along the Nashwaak, then northerly along the Loyalist grants, including a grant to Alexander Drummond along the English Settlement Road, to the starting point.

Communities
Communities at least partly within the parish. bold indicates an incorporated municipality or Indian reserve; italics indicate a name no longer in official use

 Bantalor
 Cross Creek Station
  Devon 30
  Durham Bridge
 Fredericton
 Barkers Point
  Marysville
 Sandyville
 Glencoe
 Lower Durham
 Manzer
 Mount Hope
 Nashwaak
 Nashwaak Bridge
  Nashwaak Village
  Penniac
 Pleasant Valley
 Ross
  St. Mary's 24
 South Portage
  Taymouth
 Upper Durham
 Wellington
 Zionville

Bodies of water
Bodies of water at least partly within the parish.

 Cains River
 Nashwaak River
  Saint John River
 Tay River
 East Branch
 Campbell Creek
 Carman Creek
 Grieves Creek
 Kaine Creek
 Dunbar Stream
 Penniac Stream

Islands
Islands at least partly within the parish.
 Penniac Island

Other notable places
Parks, historic sites, and other noteworthy places at least partly within the parish.
 Bantalor Protected Natural Area
 Bantalor Wildlife Management Area
 Burpee Wildlife Management Area
 Cains River Protected Natural Area
 Dunbar Falls

Demographics
Parish population total does not include Indian reserves and portion within Fredericton

Population
Population trend

Language
Mother tongue  (2016)

See also
List of parishes in New Brunswick

Notes

References

Local service districts of York County, New Brunswick
Parishes of York County, New Brunswick